Ivan Dragomiloff is a fictional character, the chairman of The Assassination Bureau, Ltd in the book of that name by Jack London. The character was played by actor Oliver Reed in the film of the same name.

Ivan is a confident character, almost to the point of being unbeatable. With the various attempts on his life by the other board members, he makes the most of their blunders to turn the tables on them. He is calm, suave, and quick to act, and makes the most of all opportunities presented.

In the movie, Dragomiloff cleverly exploits his opponents' weakness: for example, when faced by Assassination Bureau member General von Pinck (Curt Jurgens) in a Zeppelin, Dragimiloff draws a sword, knowing that his opponent cannot resist a sword duel challenge.

References

Dragomiloff, Ivan